The 2019 Open de Rennes was a professional tennis tournament played on hard courts. It was the thirteenth edition of the tournament and part of the 2019 ATP Challenger Tour. It took place in Rennes, France between 21 and 27 January 2019.

Singles main-draw entrants

Seeds

1 Rankings are as of 14 January 2019.

Other entrants
The following players received wildcards into the singles main draw:
  Antoine Cornut Chauvinc
  Evan Furness
  Hugo Gaston
  Manuel Guinard
  Adrian Mannarino

The following players received entry into the singles main draw as alternates:
  Aslan Karatsev
  Carlos Taberner

The following players received entry into the singles main draw using their ITF World Tennis Ranking:
  Javier Barranco Cosano
  Raúl Brancaccio
  Dimitar Kuzmanov
  Roman Safiullin

The following players received entry from the qualifying draw:
  Grégoire Jacq
  Fabien Reboul

The following player received entry as a lucky loser:
  Yannick Mertens

Champions

Singles

 Ričardas Berankis def.  Antoine Hoang 6–4, 6–2.

Doubles

 Sander Arends /  Tristan-Samuel Weissborn def.  David Pel /  Antonio Šančić 6–4, 6–4.

External links
Official Website

2019
2019 ATP Challenger Tour
2019 in French tennis
January 2019 sports events in France